The Black Diamond / High River Cash was an annual bonspiel on the men's World Curling Tour. It was held annually in late November / early December at the Oilfields Curling Club in  Diamond Valley, Alberta (formerly Black Diamond) and the Highwood Curling Club in High River, Alberta.

The purse for the event is $7,100.

Past champions

References

World Curling Tour events
Curling in Alberta
High River